Quzlujeh (also Romanized as Qūzlūjeh and Qūzūljeh) is a village in Kuhestan Rural District, Qaleh Chay District, Ajab Shir County, East Azerbaijan Province, Iran. At the 2006 census, its population was 1,320, in 312 families.

References 

Populated places in Ajab Shir County